The AWA Lightweight Championship is a professional wrestling championship in the South African professional wrestling promotion Africa Wrestling Alliance, contested exclusively among Lightweight wrestlers. It was created on April 7, 2009 and was first contested on the AWA House of Pain: Night of the Champions supercard, where Nick Fury won it in a six-man battle royale

Title history

See also
Africa Wrestling Alliance

References

External links
Official African Wrestling Alliance Website

Africa Wrestling Alliance championships
Lightweight wrestling championships